Ironville is an unincorporated community and census-designated place (CDP) in Blair County, Pennsylvania, United States. It was first listed as a CDP prior to the 2020 census.

The CDP is in northern Blair County, in the southeastern corner of Snyder Township. It sits in a bend on the north and east side of the Little Juniata River, just east of where the river cuts through the water gap between the northeast end of Brush Mountain and the southwest end of Bald Eagle Mountain. It is bordered to the west, across the river, by Tyrone Forge.

Pennsylvania Route 453 forms the northeastern border of the CDP; it leads northwest  to Tyrone and southeast the same distance to Birmingham. The Pittsburgh Line of the Norfolk Southern Railway passes through the east side of Ironville.

Demographics

References 

Census-designated places in Blair County, Pennsylvania
Census-designated places in Pennsylvania